Theodore E. Dailey  (September 25, 1908 – October 3, 1992) was an American football end  who played one season in the National Football League with the Pittsburgh Pirates. He played college football at the University of Pittsburgh and grew up in Phillipsburg, New Jersey where he played left end at Phillipsburg High School

References

External links
Just Sports Stats

1908 births
1992 deaths
American football ends
People from Phillipsburg, New Jersey
Phillipsburg High School (New Jersey) alumni
Pittsburgh Panthers football players
Pittsburgh Pirates (football) players
Players of American football from New Jersey